Music Inspired by Lord of the Rings may refer to:

 Music Inspired by Lord of the Rings (Bo Hansson album)
 Music Inspired by The Lord of the Rings (Mostly Autumn album)